São Pedro (Portuguese for Saint Peter) is a parish in the municipality of Vila Franca do Campo in the Azores. The population in 2011 was 1,426, in an area of 2.48 km². It is located east of Ponta Delgada and Lagoa, south of Ribeira Grande and west of Furnas and Povoação. It is the smallest parish in area but the most densely populated in Vila Franca do Campo.

References

Freguesias of Vila Franca do Campo (Azores)